Grypotheca triangularis is a moth of the Psychidae family. It was first described by Alfred Philpott in 1930 under the name Talaeporia triangularis. In 1987 John S. Dugdale placed this species within the genus Grypotheca. It is endemic to New Zealand.

References

External links

Moths described in 1930
Psychidae
Moths of New Zealand
Endemic fauna of New Zealand
Taxa named by Alfred Philpott
Endemic moths of New Zealand